The Woman Who Did  (German: Die Frau mit dem schlechten Ruf, English: The Woman with the Bad Reputation) is a 1925 German silent drama film directed by Benjamin Christensen and starring Lionel Barrymore, Gustav Fröhlich and Alexandra Sorina. It was an adaptation of the 1895 British novel The Woman Who Did by Grant Allen. The film's art direction was by Hans Jacoby.

Cast
 Lionel Barrymore as Allan Merrick 
 Gustav Fröhlich as James Compson 
 Alexandra Sorina as Herminia Barton 
 Daisy Campbell as Frau Merrick 
 Marian Alma as Diener 
 Walter Bruckmann as Tadeo 
 Danielowitsch as Kind 
 Dembot as Detektiv 
 Hertha Müller as Backfisch 
 Frida Richard as Alte Frau 
 Fritz Richard as Alter Mann 
 Mathilde Sussin as Frau Compson 
 Robert Taube as Mr. Compson 
 Eugenie Teichgräber as Dolores

See also
Lionel Barrymore filmography

Bibliography
 Bergfelder, Tim & Bock, Hans-Michael. The Concise Cinegraph: Encyclopedia of German. Berghahn Books, 2009.
 Hardt, Ursula. From Caligari to California: Erich Pommer's Life in the International Film Wars''. Berghahn Books, 1996.

External links

1925 films
1925 drama films
German drama films
Films of the Weimar Republic
German silent feature films
Films directed by Benjamin Christensen
Films based on Canadian novels
Films set in England
Remakes of British films
UFA GmbH films
Films produced by Erich Pommer
German black-and-white films
Silent drama films
1920s German films